Toranagallu, or Torangal, is a village in the southern state of Karnataka, India. It is located in the Sandur taluk of Bellary district in Karnataka.

Demographics
 India census, Toranagallu had a population of 6324 with 3390 males and 2934 females.

Transportation 
By road: NH 63 is via Toranagallu. It is presently under a massive transformation, upgrading to a four-lane road. The nearest cities to Toranagallu are Bellary and Hospet, which are each approximately 30 km from Toranagallu. Buses operating between Bellary and Hospet go via Toranagallu; the journey takes about 40–45 mins from Bellary to Hospet and vice versa.

By train: Trains operating between major centres stop at Toranagallu (TNGL).

By air: Jindal Vijaynagar Airport is located southwest of the village. Although it belongs to JSW Steel, the airport receives TruJet flights from Hyderabad and Bangalore daily.

See also
 Districts of Karnataka

References

External links
 http://Bellary.nic.in/

Villages in Bellary district